The San Marino national football team's first official match took place on 14 November 1990 against Switzerland. Previously unofficial matches had taken place against the Canadian U-23 team in 1986 and a series of matches at the 1987 Mediterranean Games against Lebanon, Turkey and Syria. These matches took place prior to the nation's affiliation with FIFA. San Marino has not yet qualified for the finals of a major international football tournament. Andy Selva remains the only player to have scored more than two goals for San Marino.

San Marino has lost all but 10 of the almost 200 matches they have played. The nation's only victory so far has come against Liechtenstein in a friendly match on 28 April 2004, with a score of 1–0, and they have drawn nine matches.

As of 6 October 2022, San Marino are ranked 211th and last in the FIFA World Rankings. Their highest international rank achieved was 118th in September 1993.

Key

International matches

Pre-FIFA (unofficial)

Official Matches (1990)

1991

1992

1993

1994

1995

1996

1997

1998

1999

2000

2001

2002

2003

2004

2005

2006

2007

2008

2009

2010

2011

2012

2013

2014

2015

2016

2017

2018

2019

2020

2021

2022

References

External links

San Marino
San Marino national football team
Football